The Helio Aircraft Company was an American aircraft manufacturer founded in 1948.

History
The Koppen-Bollinger Aircraft Corporation was founded by Otto Koppen and Lynn Bollinger in Massachusetts in 1948 to develop a light STOL utility aircraft. Initially located at Boston Metropolitan Airport in Canton, Massachusetts, it was renamed the Helio Aircraft Corporation by the time manufacture of the Helio Courier commenced in the early 1950s at a plant in Pittsburg, Kansas. The plant, located at the Atkinson Municipal Airport was acquired by Helio from Mid-States Manufacturing Company in July 1956 and was almost destroyed by a wildfire in March 1966. In 1959, the company announced it was moving its factory to Tucson, Arizona.

The business was bought by the General Aircraft Corporation in 1969, was renamed Helio Aircraft Company and continued production until 1974, when General Aircraft commenced legal proceedings against the CIA, alleging that the agency had planned to ruin the business through organizing unlicensed production of the Courier.

The production rights were sold by General Aircraft to Helio Aircraft Ltd in 1977. Despite an abortive attempt to restart production, the company remained essentially inactive until 1980. The Courier was returned to production, but only 18 aircraft were built. In 1984, the company was forced to lay off 100 workers and the following February it was evicted from its factory.

The rights to the Courier and Stallion were bought and sold a number of times more before being purchased by Helio Aircraft LLC of Prescott, Arizona, which announced plans in 2004 to return both types to production.

Aircraft

References

Notes

Bibliography

External links

 Helio Aircraft LLC website

Defunct aircraft manufacturers of the United States
Manufacturing companies established in 1948
1948 establishments in Massachusetts
Defunct manufacturing companies based in Massachusetts